JK Tallinna Kalev, also known as Tallinna Kalev or simply Kalev, is a football club based in Tallinn, Estonia, that competes in the Meistriliiga, the top flight of Estonian football. The club's home ground is the Kalevi Keskstaadion.

Formed as Meteor in 1909, the club changed its name to Kalev in 1911 after joining the Estonian Sports Association Kalev. The club were founding members of the Estonian Football Championship in 1921, and is the oldest active football club in Estonia. Kalev have won three league championship titles, in 1923, 1930 and 1955. The club was re-established in 2002 and has played in the Meistriliiga in 2007–2009, 2012–2014, 2018–2020 and again since 2022.

History

Early years
Kalev's origins lie with Meteor. Jalgpalliselts Meteor (Football Association Meteor) was formed in 1909 by students Julius Reinans and Bernhard Abrams. The team was first coached by a Scottish flax merchant John Stormonth Urquhart who also ordered the team's first uniforms, consisting of blue shirts and white shorts. The team included several players who would become notable athletes, such as future Estonia national team players Voldemar Luik and Otto Silber and Olympic runner Johannes Villemson. On 6 June 1909, Meteor and Merkuur played the first official football match in Estonia. The match took place at the grounds behind the Lower Lighthouse in Lasnamäe and was won by Meteor 4–2.

On 27 May 1911, Meteor joined the Estonian Sports Association Kalev and changed its name to Kalev. In 1913, the team moved to the new Tiigiveski Ground.

Estonian champions

In the 1920s, the newly formed Estonian Football Championship was dominated by Tallinn sides Kalev, Sport and TJK. The derby matches between the clubs drew thousands of spectators. Kalev won their first league title in 1923. The team included Estonian internationals such as Eduard Ellmann, Ernst Joll, Elmar Kaljot, August Lass and Arnold Pihlak, who went on to represent Estonia at the 1924 Summer Olympics. On 16 August 1925, the team suffered a serious setback when the board of the association expelled eight key players from the squad over their decision to play in the opening match of TJK's new ground without the board's permission. The players subsequently joined TJK.

Tallinna Kalev won their second championship in the controversial 1930 season. Although never proven officially, the victory was widely accepted as a result of match fixing. To win the title, Kalev needed to win the final game of the season against the formidable Narva Võitleja by eight goals and went on to win the match 11–0. Võitleja's performance was so poor that allegations of match fixing began instantly, with Kalev board member Aleksander Mändvere being accused of bribing Võitleja players, particularly the team's goalkeeper Viruvere.

Kalev reached the 1939 Estonian Cup final, but lost to TJK 1–4.

Kalev in Soviet football

Following World War II and the Soviet occupation of Estonia, Kalev joined the Soviet Union football league system, competing in the second tier of Soviet football from 1947 to 1954, while Kalev's second team played in the Estonian championship. In 1955, Kalev's first team returned to the Estonian championship, winning their third league title.

In 1960, Kalev joined Class A, the top flight of Soviet football. The team finished their first season in Class A in 19th place out of 22 teams. The home match against Dynamo Moscow in Kalev's Komsomol Stadium brought more than 20,000 people onto the stands and among the players playing was Dynamo's Lev Yashin, who won the Ballon d'Or three years after said match and is regarded by many as the greatest goalkeeper in the history of the sport. In the 1961 season, Kalev finished last and were relegated to Class B. Despite the relegation, Kalev showed several great performances during the season,  drawing 2:2 with Spartak Moscow, who won the bronze medal, and 0:0 with Dynamo Moscow.

Re-establishment

Tallinna Kalev was re-established on 1 September 2002 and joined the Estonian football league system. The club won the Northern division of the III liiga in 2003. In 2004, Aavo Sarap was appointed as manager and Tallinna Kalev won the East/North division of the II liiga. The club finished the 2006 Esiliiga in third place and were promoted to the Meistriliiga, returning the top flight of Estonian football. Tallinna Kalev finished the 2007 season in sixth place. In August 2009, Sarap's contract was terminated and he was replaced by his assistant Daniel Meijel. The team finished the 2009 season in last place and were relegated.

In January 2010, Sergei Ratnikov was appointed as manager. Tallinna Kalev won the 2011 Esiliiga were promoted back to the Meistriliiga. The club finished the 2012 season in ninth place, but avoided being relegated by defeating Tarvas 3–1 on aggregate in the relegation play-offs. In December 2012, Frank Bernhardt was appointed as manager. Tallinna Kalev finished the 2013 season in eighth place. In January 2014, former Estonia national team manager Tarmo Rüütli took over as manager. Rüütli subsequently left in March 2014 and Sergei Zamogilnõi took over as manager. Following a disappointing 2014 season, where Tallinna Kalev finished in 10th place and were relegated to the Esiliiga once again, Zamogilnõi was replaced by Marko Pärnpuu.

In May 2016, it was announced that Ragnar Klavan will become the club's president. Former New York Red Bulls player Joel Lindpere took over the sporting director role. Tallinna Kalev returned to the Meistriliiga after finishing the 2017 Esiliiga season as runners-up. In November 2017, Pärnupuu was replaced by Argo Arbeiter. The team finished the 2018 season in eighth place, after which Arbeiter left and Aleksandr Dmitrijev took over as manager and also led Kalev to an eighth-place finish in the 2019 season. Kalev was relegated from Meistriliiga in 2020, after finishing the season in last place.

Tallinna Kalev returned to top-flight football in 2022. Led by Daniel Meijel and Aivar Anniste, the club finished the 2022 season in eighth place.

Stadium

The club's historic home ground is the 12,000-seat Kalevi Keskstaadion. Opened on 12 July 1955, the multi-purpose stadium was built near Kalev's old Tiigiveski Ground. Initially named Kalev Komsomol Stadium, the name was changed to Kalevi Keskstaadion in 1989. It used to be the largest football stadium in Estonia until the completion of A. Le Coq Arena in 2001. The stadium is located at Staadioni 3, in Juhkentali, Kesklinn, Tallinn. Before Kalevi Keskstaadion, the club played at the historic Kalevi Aed, which was constructed by Tallinna Kalev in the early 1920s and demolished in the 1940s.

Tallinna Kalev uses the 1,198-seat artifical turf ground Sportland Arena for training and home matches during winter and early spring months.  

From 2020 season the team moved to Kadriorg Stadium, as Kalevi Keskstaadion underwent renovation due to its poor condition. Although the renovation works were completed in 2022, the football club has not returned to the 12,000-capacity stadium due to a dispute with the owner of the stadium complex, the Estonian Sports Association Kalev, which has evolved into a court case.

Players

Current squad
.

For season transfers, see transfers summer 2022 and transfers winter 2022–23.

Out on loan

Reserves and academy

Personnel

Current technical staff

Managerial history

Honours

League
 A klass/Liiduklass
 Winners (2): 1923, 1930
Esigrupp (Estonian SSR Championship)
 Winners (1): 1955
 Esiliiga
 Winners (1): 2011

Cup
 Estonian Cup
 Runners-up (1): 1939

Kit manufacturers and shirt sponsors

Seasons and statistics

References

External links

  
 JK Tallinna Kalev at Estonian Football Association

 
1911 establishments in Estonia
2002 establishments in Estonia
Association football clubs established in 1911
Association football clubs established in 2002
Kalev
Kalev
Meistriliiga clubs